Shane Flanagan (born 2 December 1965) is an Australian professional rugby league football coach, and was the Head Coach of the Cronulla Sutherland Sharks. He was appointed assistant coach of NRL team Cronulla-Sutherland Sharks in 2006 and was subsequently appointed to the top position when former coach Ricky Stuart resigned on 20 July 2010. Flanagan is currently the Assistant Coach at the Manly Warringah Sea Eagles and Coaching Director of the PNG Kumuls.
He is the father of Canterbury-Bankstown Bulldogs player Kyle Flanagan.

Playing career
Flanagan played S. G. Ball Cup, Jersey Flegg Cup, and President's Cup for St. George Dragons prior to making his first-grade debut for the club in 1987. He came off the bench in this game, a round 11 match against the Western Suburbs Magpies, and played his second game against the same opposition in round 24. After making three first-grade appearances in 1987, he made none in 1988.

In 1989, Flanagan joined the Western Suburbs Magpies. In his second game for them, he accused his Brisbane Broncos opponent Andrew Gee of biting, showing the referee a mark on his forearm. The Magpies’ CEO later decided not to take any action against Gee. In round 8, Flanagan scored his first top-grade try in a tight victory over St. George at Kogarah Oval. He scored his second and final try of the year in round 16, darting over from dummy-half.

After being a regular starter at hooker in 1989 and 1990, he played only five games in 1991 under new coach Warren Ryan, with Ryan preferring new recruit Joe Thomas in the hooking role. His last game for the Magpies was a winning play-off for fifth spot, which allowed the Magpies to make their first semi-finals appearance since 1982.

He moved to Parramatta Eels in 1992 and remained with the club until 1994, when he retired from playing football following a knee injury. Flanagan was later engaged to coach the Parramatta S.G. Ball team in 1997.

Coaching career
After spending the 1997 season in the English Super League as Stuart Raper's assistant at the Castleford Tigers, Flanagan returned to Australia and was eventually appointed to an assistant coaching role at the Sydney Roosters for two years under Ricky Stuart. He went on to coach the Australian Schoolboys side, was an assistant coach for Australia under Stuart in 2007, and was an assistant coach under Craig Bellamy for New South Wales from 2008 to 2010.

In July 2010, Flanagan was instated as Cronulla-Sutherland head coach following Ricky Stuart's resignation with six weeks remaining in the 2010 season.

As head coach of the Cronulla-Sutherland Sharks, Flanagan lost his first three games mostly by small margins before a breakthrough win came against premiership contenders the Sydney Roosters in round 23 of the 2010 season. The Sharks won 18–12. The Sharks won one more game in the 2010 season, against the Gold Coast Titans.

In the 2012 NRL season, Flanagan coached Cronulla to finish 7th on the ladder. Flanagan built a reputation for signing key players to the club. Having signed Todd Carney the previous year, Flanagan secured the purchases of Beau Ryan and Chris Heighington from the West Tigers, Michael Gordon and Luke Lewis from the Panthers, and Jonathon Wright from the Bulldogs.

In 2013, following a year-long investigation into the Sharks' supplements program carried out during the 2011 NRL season, Flanagan was suspended from his role for a period of 12 months.

In the 2016 NRL season he guided Cronulla to a top-four finish. They would travel to Canberra in the first week of the 2016 Finals and record a 16–14 victory thus earning a preliminary final at Allianz Stadium. The Cronulla-Sutherland Sharks would win this preliminary final against the 2015 premiers, the North Queensland Cowboys, by 32-20 thus earning a place in the 2016 Grand Final. On 2 October, the Cronulla-Sutherland Sharks would record a 14–12 victory over the Melbourne Storm and win the Premiership becoming the first head coach of the Cronulla-Sutherland Sharks to win a premiership.

In the 2017 NRL season he guided Cronulla to the finals.  In week one, Cronulla played against North Queensland in the elimination final.  Cronulla went to be upset 15–14.
In 2018, Flanagan took Cronulla to a top-four finish.  Cronulla lost their week one final match against Eastern Suburbs before defeating Penrith the following week 21–20.  In the preliminary final, Cronulla was defeated by Melbourne 22–6.

On 19 December 2018, Flanagan was de-registered as a coach indefinitely for failing to adhere to the conditions of his suspension in 2014.  The NRL integrity unit had found that Flanagan had sent more than fifty emails exchanged between Flanagan, club management, and the football department which was strictly against the conditions of his suspension which included that Flanagan was to have no contact or involvement with the club during his ban.  The NRL also fined Cronulla $800,000 as punishment.

On 20 September 2019, it was announced that Flanagan was allowed to return to the NRL but under strict conditions.  He was still unable to hold a head coaching role at any club until 2022 but was allowed to return as an assistant coach. He joined his junior club the St. George Illawarra Dragons as an assistant coach to Paul McGregor beginning in the 2020 NRL season. Flanagan's role is specifically focused on defence. Flanagan was the most important of one of 8 coaching changes at the Dragons following a dismal 2019.

In September 2020, Flanagan was told his services would not be required in 2021 by St. George after the appointment of new head coach Anthony Griffin.

On February 24 2022, it was announced that Flanagan would return to the Dragons, this time as a List Management Consultant.

References

External links
Cronulla Sharks profile

1965 births
Living people
Australian rugby league coaches
Australian rugby league players
Cronulla-Sutherland Sharks coaches
Parramatta Eels players
Rugby league hookers
Rugby league players from Sydney
St. George Dragons players
Western Suburbs Magpies players